Best Musical may refer to:

Critics' Circle Theatre Award, Best Musical
Evening Standard Award, Best Musical
Laurence Olivier Award for Best New Musical
Laurence Olivier Award for Best Musical Revival
Manchester Evening News Theatre Awards, Best Musical
New York Innovative Theatre Awards, Outstanding Production of a Musical
Outer Critics Circle Award, Best Musical
Tony Award for Best Musical
Tony Award for Best Revival of a Musical